Matthew Del Negro (born August 2, 1972) is an American actor.

Life and career
Matthew Del Negro was born in Mount Kisco, New York, as the youngest of three children. He grew up in Westchester County. He is a graduate of Boston College, where he played Division I lacrosse.

After graduating, Del Negro began to study acting, and after appearing in several minor commercials and independent films, he was cast as Brian Cammarata on The Sopranos. This has led to appearances in other television series, such as The West Wing, Law & Order, Scandal, Stargate: Atlantis, Las Vegas, Beautiful People, CSI: Crime Scene Investigation, NCIS, Joan of Arcadia, Happy Endings, Rizzoli & Isles, Lie to Me, Teen Wolf and United States of Tara. He currently is in Goliath on Amazon Prime.

His film appearances include Chelsea Walls, Ira and Abby, Trailer Park of Terror, Saving Lincoln and the upcoming Don't Mess with Texas. He has also been cast in several theater productions. He provided the voice of Ops Com in the 2011 video game SOCOM 4: U.S. Navy SEALs. Further video game work includes L.A. Noire and Mass Effect 3.

In 2019, Del Negro began a recurring role on the Showtime crime drama series City on a Hill; he was promoted to a series regular for the series' second season.

He currently teaches acting classes in Santa Monica.

Filmography

Film

Television

Video games

References

External links

"Marina-Venice Movie Magic" at ArgonautNews.com

1972 births
Living people
20th-century American male actors
21st-century American male actors
American male film actors
American male television actors
Boston College Eagles men's lacrosse players
Male actors from New York (state)
People from Mount Kisco, New York